Kevin Charles "Pro" Hart, MBE (30 May 192828 March 2006), was an Australian artist, born in Broken Hill, New South Wales, who was considered the father of the Australian Outback painting movement and his works are widely admired for capturing the true spirit of the outback. He grew up on his family's sheep farm in Menindee and was nicknamed "Professor" (hence "Pro") during his younger days, when he was known as an inventor.

Art styles 

Hart typically painted with oils or acrylics, using paint brushes and sponges, and depict scenes of rural town life, nature, topical commentary, and some religious subjects. His illustrations for the collection of Henry Lawson's poems show keen powers of character observation combined with an obvious wit. Hart was also a sculptor, working with welded steel, bronze and ceramics.

Pro Hart was known for his novel techniques including "cannon painting" and "balloon painting", and in 2002 was using his own DNA as a mark of authenticity in his paintings. Retrospective application of a DNA mark is available for older Pro Hart paintings. An example of the Pro Hart Cannon painting was when a commercial on television was shown for stain resistant carpet, covering the entire carpet with his unique painting style.

For most of his career Hart was dismissed by many critics as a mere showman, with his art often judged as populist and derivative, and not good enough for serious critical attention. Barry Pearce, the head curator of Australian art at the Art Gallery of New South Wales said that comparing Hart with the artists whose work normally hangs in the gallery was "rather like Slim Dusty being compared to Mozart". Hart considered his critics to be a part of the "art mafia" and noted that he achieved his success without any help from the arts establishment.

Beliefs 
He frequently addressed political themes in his artwork. When asked about this subject, he stated "If I said what I thought sometimes, I might get sued so I paint to show what is going on, to bring out the truth and make people aware".

The painting Aboriginal Land Rights is from Pro Hart's "masks" period. This painting highlights his conspiracy ideas with regards to land rights. The scene has a map of Australia with the Aboriginal Flag over the top. The people in the background "playing the communist cards" have Illuminati logos on their ties. In the foreground are a group of Aboriginal people, perhaps negotiating their rights.

Pastimes 
He collected vintage cars and motor cycles, and invented many kinds of engines and machines. He enjoyed pistol shooting, reading the Bible, and organ music. He was the proud owner of a Rodgers electric pipe organ, which was said to be the largest of its kind in Australia. This was installed in his gallery, a step which considerably enhanced its value as a Broken Hill tourist attraction.

Awards 
He was made a Member of the Order of the British Empire in 1976. In 1982 he received an Honorary Life Membership of Society International Martinique for outstanding artistic achievement. He received an Australian Citizen of the Year award in 1983, and was known for his charitable work and generosity.

Final years 
Pro Hart developed motor neurone disease.  He died on 28 March 2006.  He had been unable to paint for the last six months of his life. A large state funeral was held for him on 4 April 2006 in Broken Hill — the first state funeral in New South Wales to be held west of the Blue Mountains.

He was interred in the Broken Hill cemetery.

References

External links

 Artist Pro Hart dies Australian Broadcasting Corporation news item.
 Artist Pro Hart dies Sydney Morning Herald
 Obituary for Kevin Charles "Pro" Hart MBE  Obits.com.au - Australian Death Notices, Funeral Notices and Obituaries
 Pro Hart Gallery
Pro Hart at Australian Art
 Pro Hart at Australian Prints
 Interview with Pro Hart in Broken Hill from 1976 from the National Film & Sound Archive of Australia's australianscreen online.
The Hart legacy

1928 births
2006 deaths
People from Broken Hill, New South Wales
Australian Members of the Order of the British Empire
Deaths from motor neuron disease
Neurological disease deaths in New South Wales
20th-century Australian painters